Enki Bilal (born Enes Bilal; born 7 October 1951) is a French comic book creator, comics artist and film director.

Biography

Early life
Bilal was born in Belgrade, PR Serbia, Yugoslavia, to a Czech mother, Ana, who came to Belgrade as child from Karlovy Vary, and a Bosnian Muslim father, Muhamed Hamo Bilal, from Ljubuški, who had been Josip Broz Tito's tailor. When he was five years old, his father managed to take a trip and stay in Paris as a political émigré. Enki and the rest of the family, his mother Ana and sister Enisa, stayed in Yugoslavia, and four years later they followed. Enki Bilal has no sense of belonging to any ethnic group and religion, nor is he obsessed with soil and roots. He said in one interview: "I also feel Bosnian by my father's origin, a Serb by my place of birth and a Croat by my relationship with a certain one to my childhood friends, not to mention my other Czech half, who I am inherited from mother".

Education and career
At age 14, he met René Goscinny and with his encouragement applied his talent to comics. He produced work for Goscinny's Franco-Belgian comics magazine Pilote in the 1970s, publishing his first story, Le Bol Maudit, in 1972.

In 1975, Bilal began working with script writer Pierre Christin on a series of dark and surreal tales, resulting in the body of work titled Légendes d'Aujourd'hui.

In 1983, Bilal was asked by film director Alain Resnais to collaborate on his film La vie est un roman, for which Bilal provided painted images that were incorporated in the "medieval" episodes of the film.

He is best known for the Nikopol trilogy (La Foire aux immortels, La Femme piège and Froid Équateur), which took more than a decade to complete. Bilal wrote the script and did the artwork. The final chapter, Froid Équateur, was chosen book of the year by the magazine Lire and is acknowledged by the inventor of chess boxing, Iepe Rubingh as the inspiration for the sport.

Quatre? (2007), the last book in the Hatzfeld tetralogy,  deals with the breakup of Yugoslavia from a future viewpoint. The first installment came in 1998 in the shape of Le Sommeil du Monstre opening with the main character, Nike, remembering the war in a series of traumatic flashbacks. The third chapter of the tetralogy is Rendez-vous à Paris (2006), which was the fifth best selling new comic of 2006, with 280,000 copies sold.

His cinematic career was revived with the expensive Immortel, his first attempt to adapt his books to the screen. The film divided critics, some panning the use of CGI characters but others seeing it as a faithful reinterpretation of the books.

On 13 May 2008 a video game based on the Nikopol trilogy was announced titled Nikopol: Secrets of the Immortals. Published in North America by Got Game Entertainment in August 2008, the game is a "point and click" adventure for the PC; however, the Lead Designer was Benoit Sokal and not Bilal himself, who was the art designer, along with Yoshitaka Amano, for the video game Beyond Good and Evil 2.

In 2012, Bilal was featured in a solo exhibition at The Louvre. The exhibition, titled "The Ghosts of the Louvre", ran from 20 December 2012 to 18 March 2013. The exhibition was organized by Fabrice Douar, and featured a series of paintings of "Ghosts", done atop photographs that Bilal took of the Louvre's collection.

Awards
1980: Prix RTL – for best adult comic
1987: Angoulême Festival, France, Grand Prix de la ville d'Angoulême
1993: Best book of the year Award from Lire magazine
1997: Brussels International Festival of Fantasy Film, Special Mention
1999: Adamson Award, Sweden, for Best International Comic Book Cartoonist
1999: Angoulême Festival, Nominated for Best comic book
2004: Angoulême Festival, Nominated for Audience award
2004: Fantasia Ubisoft Festival, Gold medal for Best Groundbreaking Film, Bronze Medal for Best International Film (public prizes)
2006: International Horror Guild Award, Best Illustrated Narrative, for Memories

Bibliography

Légendes d'Aujourd'hui
(written by Pierre Christin)
 La Croisière des oubliés (1975, Dargaud; The Cruise of Lost Souls, also translated as The Voyage Of Those Forgotten)
 Le Vaisseau de pierre (1976, Dargaud; Ship of Stone, also translated as Progress!)
 La ville qui n'existait pas (1977, Dargaud; The Town That Didn't Exist, also translated as The City That Didn't Exist)

Fins de Siècle
(written by Pierre Christin)
 Les Phalanges de l'ordre noir (1979, Dargaud; The Black Order Brigade)
 Partie de chasse (1983, Dargaud; The Hunting Party)

Nikopol
 La Foire aux immortels (1980, Dargaud; The Carnival of Immortals)
 La Femme piège (1986, Dargaud; The Woman Trap)
 Froid Équateur (1992, Les Humanoïdes Associés; Cold Equator)

Monstre
 Le Sommeil du monstre (1998, Les Humanoïdes Associés; The Dormant Beast)
 32 Décembre (2003, Les Humanoïdes Associés; December 32)
 Rendez-vous à Paris (2006, Casterman; Rendezvous in Paris)
 Quatre? (2007, Casterman; Four?)

Coup de Sang
 Animal'Z (2009, Casterman)
 Julia & Roem (2011, Casterman)
 La Couleur de l'Air (2014, Casterman)

Bug
 “Tome 1” (2017, Casterman)
 “Tome 2” (2019, Casterman)
 “Tome 3” (2022,Casterman)

Other
 Mémoires d'outre-espace, Histoires courtes 1974–1977 (Memories From Outer Space, 1978)
 Exterminateur 17 (Exterminator 17, 1979; written by Jean-Pierre Dionnet)
 Los Angeles – L'Étoile oubliée de Laurie Bloom (Los Angeles – The Forgotten Star of Laurie Bloom, 1984)
 Hors Jeu (Off Play, 1987; with Patrick Cauvin)
 Coeurs sanglants et autres faits divers (Bleeding Hearts and Other Stories, 1988; written by Pierre Christin)
 Bleu Sang (Blue Blood, 1994)
 Mémoires d'autre temps, Histoires courtes 1971–1981 (Memories From Other Times, 1996)
 EnkiBilalAnDeuxMilleUn (EnkiBilalInTwoThousandOne, 1996)
 Tykho Moon – livre d'un film (Tykho Moon – Book of a Film, 1996)
 Un Siècle d'Amour (A century of Love , 1999)
 Le Sarcophage (The Sarcophagus, 2000)
 Magma (2000)
 Les Fantômes du Louvre (2012)

English translations

Comics in Heavy Metal Magazine
From its start through the 1980s Bilal was a frequent guest in American Heavy Metal magazine. Many famous Bilal comics made their English debut in this period of the magazine. Although shorter stories appeared later in the '90s, Heavy Metal readers had to wait until 2012 for another graphic novel feature from Bilal.

Graphic novels

Short stories
{|class="wikitable"
|-
!English title!!Date!!Issue!!Note!!Number of pages
|-
|width="40%" |Crossroads of the Universe
|width="13%" |1977/07
|width="20%" |Vol. 1 No. 4
|width="20%" |reprinted in Greatest Hits 1994
|width="7%" |7
|-
|The Death of Orlaon, or: Legendary Immortality
|1978/07
|Vol. 2 No. 3
|reprinted in The Best of 1982
|4
|-
|Ultimate Negotiations
|1979/01
|Vol. 2 No. 9
|
|4
|-|True Tales of Outer Space: The Planet Of No Return
|1979/02
|Vol. 2 No. 10
|
|7
|-
|Going Native
|1979/04
|Vol. 2 No. 12
|
|7
|-
|The Road to Ruin
|1980/02
|Vol. 3 No. 10
|written by Pierre De La Varech
|2
|-
|Of Needle and Thread
|1980/04
|Vol. 4 No. 1
|reprinted in hardcover version of Greatest Hits 1994
|4
|-
|Only the Plitch
|1980/05
|Vol. 4 No. 2
|reprinted in The Best of No. 2 1986
|10
|-
|Amusing Stories Section: A Day in the Log of the City of Alger
|1982/08
|Vol. 6 No. 5
|written by Jean-Pierre Dionnet
|4
|-
|Enki Bilal Enters the World of Hardcore Science Fiction
|1983/10
|Vol. 7 No. 7
|Art gallery
|7
|-
|The Gray Man
|1984/09
|Vol. 9 No. 6
|reprinted in Greatest Hits 1994
|1
|-
|Over the Wall
|1984
|Son of Heavy Metal
|
|4
|-
|The Leader's Surprise
|1997/07
|Vol. 21 No. 3
|
|4
|-
|Mondovision
|1997/11
|Vol. 21 No. 5
|
|4
|-
|Close the Shutters and Open Your Eyes
|1997
|Horror Special – Vol. 11 No 1
|
|10
|-
|On The Wing
|1997/Fall
|20 Years of Heavy Metal – Vol. 11 No. 2
|
|7
|-
|New York, 2000 AD.
|1998/01
|Vol. 21 No. 6
|
|4
|-
|The Slow Boat to Vega
|1998/03
|Vol. 22 No. 1
|
|4
|}

Comic Book Albums
Since the late seventies, it were publishers NBM, Catalan Communications, Humanoids Publishing, and Titan Comics that have released several albums by Bilal.

NBM
 The Call of the Stars (March 1979. Flying Buttress Publications)
A collection of short stories.
 The Phantoms of the Louvre (June 2014. NBM Publishing.)

Catalan Communications (NY publishing house)
Paperback books
Exterminator 17 (June 1986. 60 pages)
Gods in Chaos: A Graphic Novel (February 1988.) – First installment of the Nikopol Trilogy
The Woman Trap (May 1988.) – Second installment of the Nikopol Trilogy
The Town That Didn't Exist (February 1989. 56 pages.) - First installment of Légendes d'Aujourd'hui
The Ranks of the Black Order (June 1989. 80 pages.) - Second installment of Légendes d'Aujourd'hui
The Hunting Party (March 1990. ) - Third installment of Légendes d'Aujourd'hui
Outer States (July 1990.)

Humanoids Publishing
Hardcover, large format books
The Nikopol Trilogy (February 2000. 176 pages. )
The Black Order Brigade (May 2000. 88 pages, hardcover.)
Ship of stone (2001.)
The Cruise of Lost Souls (2001. 56 pages)
The Hunting Party (March 2002. 100 pages. )
Memories From Outer Space (April 2002. 52 pages. )
Exterminator 17 (June 2002. 66 pages. )
The Dormant Beast (5 October 2002. 72 pages.)
The Town That Didn't Exist (March 2003. 56 pages, Hardcover.)

The Bilal Library:
(small format – 190 × 260 cm – paperbacks)
Townscapes (1 July 2004. 176 pages. )
The Beast Trilogy: Chapters 1& 2 (29 September 2004. 128 pages. )
The Nikopol Trilogy (10 November 2004. 176 pages )
The Chaos Effect (19 January 2005. 168 pages) Containing The Black Order Brigade and The Hunting Party
Memories (20 April 2005. 144 pages. ) Contains Memories of Outer Space and Memories of Outer Times

Trade Paperback:
The Dormant Beast (March 2000. 72 pages. )

Titan Comics
Hardcover, large format books
The Nikopol Trilogy (April 2016. 184 pages. )
Century's End (November 2016. 184 pages. )
Exterminator 17 (November 2018. 240 pages. )
Monster (September 2019. 264 pages. )
Legends of Today (February 2021. 176 pages. )

Filmography
 Bunker Palace Hôtel (1989)
 Tykho Moon (1996)
 Immortel, ad vitam (2004)
 Cinémonstre (2006)

Notes

References

 Bilal publications in Pilote, Metal Hurlant, (A SUIVRE) BDoubliées 
 Enki Bilal at Bedetheque

External links

 Enki Bilal Casterman's page
 Enki Bilal presented at Lambiek's Comiclopedia
 Bilal fansite 
 

French comics artists
French comics writers
French film directors
French illustrators
Science fiction artists
French speculative fiction artists
Video game artists
Writers who illustrated their own writing
1951 births
Living people
Artists from Paris
Artists from Belgrade
Yugoslav emigrants to France
Grand Prix de la ville d'Angoulême winners
French male non-fiction writers
French graphic novelists
French people of Czech descent 
French people of Bosnia and Herzegovina descent